Boss Bone is an album by trombonist Al Grey recorded in late 1963 and released on the Argo label.

Track listing
All compositions by Al Gey except where noted
 "Smile" (Charlie Chaplin, John Turner, Geoffrey Parsons) – 2:45
 "Terrible Cap" – 3:02
 "Mona Lisa" (Ray Evans, Jay Livingston) – 3:30	
 "Tacos and Grits" – 3:22	
 "Can't You Feel It" – 4:05	
 "Salty Mama" – 3:30	
 "The Give Off" – 4:32
 "Day In, Day Out" (Rube Bloom, Johnny Mercer) – 5:50	
 "Grey Being Blue" – 5:47

Personnel 
Al Grey – trombone
John Young – piano 
Leo Blevins – guitar
Ike Isaacs – bass 
Phil Thomas – drums

References

1964 albums
Al Grey albums
Argo Records albums
Albums produced by Esmond Edwards